Delitzschala is an extinct palaeodictyopteran, the oldest known to science. It was discovered by two German entomologists in 1996. Delitzschala had a wingspan of just 2½ cm (1 in) and an irregular pattern of coloured spots on its wings. Although it was 320 million years old, these spots were still visible in the fossil. It is presumed that they camouflaged the animal, since dragonflies are unable to fold their wings.

References 

 Dragonhunters V. Medland (2007) Econotes at the Cofrin Center for Biodiversity

External links
 Delitzschala at The Paleobiology Database

Fossil taxa described in 1996
Mississippian insects
Fossils of Germany
Prehistoric insect genera
Palaeodictyopteroidea